The 2021–22 Feyenoord Basketball season was the 68th season in the existence of the club and the 4th as Feyenoord Basketball. It was the first season the club played in the BNXT League.

Roster

Depth chart

Transcations

In 

|}

Out

|}

References

Feyenoord
Feyenoord
Feyenoord Basketball seasons